Azure Virtual Desktop (AVD), formerly known as Windows Virtual Desktop (WVD), is a Microsoft Azure-based system for virtualizing its Windows operating systems, providing virtualized desktops and applications securely in the cloud (over the Internet). It is aimed at enterprise customers rather than at individual users.

WVD was first announced by Microsoft in September 2018, available as a public preview in March 2019, and generally available at the end of September 2019.

Azure Virtual Desktop with Windows 10/11 Enterprise Multi-Session is a cloud-based alternative to an on-premise Remote Desktop Server (RDS). AVD is deployed in Azure Cloud as a virtual machine. License costs are already included in several Microsoft 365 subscriptions, including Microsoft 365 Business Premium or Microsoft 365 E3.

Availability / Compatibility 
Azure Virtual Desktop supports Windows 10 multi-session, Windows 10 single-session, Windows 7 single-session, Windows Server 2012 R2 and newer operating systems.

See also
Windows 365
Remote Desktop Services
Windows Virtual PC

References

External links

Centralized computing
Remote desktop
Thin clients
Microsoft cloud services